Italian pop singer Laura Pausini rose to fame in 1993 when she won the Sanremo Music Festival in the "Newcomers' Section" with the song "La solitudine". Following the success of her Italian-language albums Laura Pausini (1993) and Laura (1994), Pausini released an eponymous Spanish-language compilation album in 1994. Starting from her third full-length record, she recorded her albums both in Italian and Spanish, with the exception of 2002's From the Inside, her only English-language album composed of new material, and the holiday album Laura Xmas (2016), released in English and Spanish.
Occasionally, she also recorded songs in Portuguese, French, Catalan and in Italian dialects such as Neapolitan and Sicilian.

Additionally, her recordings include several live performances, both of her own material and of songs originally by other artists. She appeared in the soundtrack of Message in a Bottle (1999), as well as in albums by several Italian and international artists, including Josh Groban, Gloria Estefan, Fiorella Mannoia, Andrea Bocelli, Elio e le Storie Tese, Nek, Miguel Bosé, Charles Aznavour, and Juan Gabriel. Pausini also took part in multiple charity releases: she was one of the artists performing "Todo para ti", the Spanish version of Michael Jackson's "What More Can I Give" (2003); in 2009, she recorded the track "Domani 21/04.09" as part of the Italian supergroup Artisti Uniti per l'Abruzzo, raising funds to support the victims of the 2009 L'Aquila earthquake; later during the same year, she promoted the project Amiche per l'Abruzzo, for which she recorded a live album together with several Italian female artists, also producing the single "Donna d'Onna"; finally, as part of the project Artists for Chile, she took part in the recording of a cover of Violeta Parra's "Gracias a la Vida", in response of the 2010 Chile earthquake.

Songs 
Symbols
 Indicates songs released as singles

See also 
Laura Pausini discography

Notes 
A  An asterisk beside an album title denotes the song to be available as a bonus track on certain editions of said album.
B  Songwriters are adapted from the Italian Society of Authors and Publishers database, except where noted.
C  The track is a medley including the following songs:
 "Disco Inferno" (Leroy Green, Ron Kersey)
 "Never Can Say Goodbye" (Clifton Davis)
 "Celebration" (Ronald Nathan Bell, Claydes Charles Smith. George Melvin Brown. James "J.T." Taylor, Robert Spike Mickens, Earl Eugene Toon Jr., Dennis Ronald Thomas, Robert Earl Bell, Eumir Deodato)
 "Relight My Fire" (Dan Hartman)
 "Don't Let Me Be Misunderstood" (Bennie Benjamin, Gloria Caldwell, Sol Marcus)
 "Le Freak" (Bernard Edwards, Nile Rodgers)
 "We Are Family" (Bernard Edwards, Nile Rodgers)
 "Girls Just Want to Have Fun" (Robert Hazard)
 "Self Control" (Giancarlo Bigazzi, Raffaele Riefoli, Steve Piccolo)
 "Tarzan Boy" (Maurizio Bassi, Naimy Hackett)
 "In alto mare" (Oscar Avogadro, Daniele Pace, Mario Lavezzi)
 "Crying at the Discoteque"  (Alexander Bard, Anders Hansson, Anders Wollbeck, Bernard Edwards, Michael Goulos, Nile Rodgers)
 "Venus" (Robbie van Leeuwen)
 "Hot Stuff" (Pete Bellotte, Harold Faltermeyer, Keith Forsey)
 "What Is Love" (Dee Dee Halligan, Junior Torello)
 "The Rhythm of the Night" (Giorgio Spagna, Francesco Bontempi, Annerley Gordon, Peter Glenister, Mike Gaffey)
 "Rumore" (Andrea Lo Vecchio, Guido Maria Ferilli)
 "Born to Be Alive" (Patrick Hernandez)
 "Walk Like an Egyptian" (Liam Sternberg)
 "You're the One That I Want" (John Farrar)
 "Y.M.C.A." (Henri Belolo, Jacques Morali, Victor Willis)

References

External links 
 Laura Pausini's official website

Pausini, Laura
Laura Pausini